Gregory C. Gibson (he/him) (born 25 July 1963) is a professor in the School of Biological Sciences at the Georgia Institute of Technology (Georgia Tech), where he is also director of the Center for Integrative Genomics.

Biography
Gibson grew up in Canberra, Australia. He received his undergraduate degree in biology from the University of Sydney in Australia in 1985, and his Ph.D. from the University of Basel in Switzerland in 1989. He was an assistant professor at the University of Michigan from 1994 to 1998, where he received a fellowship from the David and Lucile Packard Foundation. In 1998, he joined the faculty of North Carolina State University as an assistant professor, where he became an associate professor in 2001 and the William Neal Reynolds Distinguished Professor of Genetics in 2005. He was elected a fellow of the American Association for the Advancement of Science in 2006, and served as an Australian Professorial Fellow at the University of Queensland from 2008 to 2009, after which he joined the faculty at Georgia Tech.

References

External links
Faculty page

1963 births
Living people
Georgia Tech faculty
Australian geneticists
People from Canberra
Australian emigrants to the United States
University of Sydney alumni
University of Basel alumni
University of Michigan faculty
North Carolina State University faculty
Fellows of the American Association for the Advancement of Science